Charles Allen may refer to:

Politicians
Charles Allen (Massachusetts politician) (1797–1869), American politician and congressman in Massachusetts 
Charles Allen (Australian politician) (1833–1913), Australian politician and member of the Tasmanian House of Assembly
Charles Herbert Allen (1848–1934), American politician and congressman in Massachusetts, later Governor of Puerto Rico
Charles Allen (Stroud MP) (1861–1930), English Liberal politician who represented Stroud, 1900–1914
Charles Francis Egerton Allen, British MP for Pembroke and Haverfordwest, 1892–1895
Charles A. Allen (Los Angeles politician) (fl. 1941–1947), American politician and member of the Los Angeles City Council
Charles Allen (Washington, D.C., politician) (born 1977), American politician and member of the Council of the District of Columbia

Sports
Charles Allen (cricketer) (1878–1958), English cricketer
Charles Elliot Allen (1880–1966), Irish rugby union player
Charles A. Allen (American football) (fl. 1900), American football coach
Charles Gladstone Allen (1868 – 1924) was a British tennis player. Also the brother of Edward Roy (Roy) Allen, another notable tennis player.
Chuck Allen (1939–2016), American football player
Charles Allen (hurdler) (born 1977), Canadian hurdler

Others
Charles Allen (jurist) (1827–1913), American judge in Massachusetts
Charles Grant Allen (1848–1899), Canadian science writer, author and novelist
Charles B. Allen (fl. 1850), American founder of "Order of the Star Spangled Banner" secret society
Charles Metcalf Allen (1871–1950), hydraulic engineer
Charles Elmer Allen (1872–1954), American botanist
Charles L. Allen (1913–2005), American minister
Charles M. Allen (1916–2000), U.S. federal judge
Charles M. Allen (engineer), a Maxim Integrated applications engineer
Charles Allen (RAF officer) (1899–1974), British World War I flying ace
Charles E. Allen (born 1936), American intelligence official at the CIA and Department of Homeland Security
Charles Allen (writer) (1940–2020), British writer and historian
Charles Allen, Baron Allen of Kensington (born 1957), English businessman

See also
Charlie Allen (disambiguation)
Allen (surname)